Midpark High School was a public high school located in Middleburg Heights, Ohio, southwest of Cleveland. It was one of two high schools in the Berea City School District, along with Berea High School. Founded in 1962, it primarily served Middleburg Heights and Brook Park, as well as a portion of Berea. MHS athletic teams were known as the Meteors with school colors of orange and brown and competed in the Southwestern Conference.

At the conclusion of the 2012–13 school year, the school was closed and merged with rival Berea High School to create Berea–Midpark High School, which is located in the building that previously housed Berea High School. Beginning with the 2013–14 school year, the Midpark building became Middleburg Heights Junior High School for the district's 7th–9th grade students. In August 2018, the building was renamed Berea–Midpark Middle School for grades five through eight, while ninth graders were moved to Berea–Midpark High School.

Notable alumni
Michael Cavanaugh, musician
Eric Ewazen, composer 
Diana Glyer, award winning author
John Guzik, professional football player in the National Football League
Aman Sharma, actor (adult films)
Ken Kravec, professional baseball player, scout, and executive in Major League Baseball
Lee Roberts, professional basketball player in multiple leagues

Notes and references

High schools in Cuyahoga County, Ohio
Public high schools in Ohio
Defunct schools in Ohio
1962 establishments in Ohio